You're My Everything may refer to:

Albums
 You're My Everything, by Gianni Basso 
 You're My Everything, by Nat King Cole
 You're My Everything, by Rich Perry
 You're My Everything, by Ghana's KICC Choir with Helen Yawson

Songs
 "You're My Everything" (1931 song), by Harry Warren, Mort Dixon, and Joe Young
 "You're My Everything" (Anita Baker song), 2004
 "You're My Everything" (Santa Esmeralda song), by Santa Esmeralda
 "You're My Everything" (The Temptations song)
 "You Are My Everything" by Surface
 "(You Are) My Everything", by Ariana Grande from My Everything
 "You're My Everything", by Rance Allen
 "You're My Everything", by René Froger
 "You're My Everything", by Lee Garrett
 "You're My Everything", by Derrick Harriott
 "You're My Everything", by George Hughley
 "You're My Everything", by Bobby Powell
 "You're My Everything", by Anny Schilder
 "You're My Everything", by Slim Smith
 "You're My Everything", by Alvin Stardust
 "You're My Everything", by The Vanguards

Other
You're My Everything (film), 1949 film directed by Walter Lang starring Dan Dailey and Anne Baxter
You're the First, the Last, My Everything